William Ellawala (born 1834) was a Ceylonese legislator. He was the Kandyan Sinhalese member of the Legislative Council of Ceylon. He was appointed to the post of Rate Mahatmaya by the British Government of Ceylon.

Born to Banda from Sabaragamuwa, he educated at the Ratnapura School and S. Thomas' College, Mutwal. He joined the government service in the Native Department and was appointed as a Rate Mahatmaya in 1856.

He married Jane Petronella, daughter of Mudaliyar Don Bartholomew. His daughter Agnes married Mahawalatenne Rate Mahattaya of Balangoda and their daughters are Jane Mahawalatenne Ebrahim Obeysekara Jayawardena Kataluwa Walawwa Rosalind Mahawatenne married Barnes Ratwatte Dissawe. His great grand daughter Sirimavo Bandaranaike became the first female Prime Minister in the world.

See also
List of political families in Sri Lanka

External links & References

Sri Lankan Buddhists
Members of the Legislative Council of Ceylon
Sinhalese politicians